Luigi Piangerelli (born 19 October 1973 in Porto Recanati) is an Italian former football player.

He was a key player for A.C. Cesena at Serie B. After Cesena relegated, he joined Lecce, which newly promoted to Serie A.

In January 2004, he was signed by Fiorentina and returned to Cesena in 2009.

Honours and awards
Serie B promotion: Lecce (1999, 2003), Fiorentina (2004)

References

Italian footballers
A.C. Cesena players
U.S. Lecce players
ACF Fiorentina players
Brescia Calcio players
U.S. Triestina Calcio 1918 players
Serie A players
Serie B players
Serie C players
Sportspeople from the Province of Macerata
1973 births
Living people
Association football midfielders
Footballers from Marche